Blue Lake is a lake in Madera County, California, in the United States.

The name is likely descriptive.

See also
List of lakes in California

References

Lakes of California
Lakes of Madera County, California
Lakes of Northern California